Chlorobaptella is a monotypic moth genus of the family Crambidae erected by Eugene G. Munroe in 1995. Its only species, Chlorobaptella rufistrigalis, was first described by William Barnes and James Halliday McDunnough in 1914. It is found in North America, where it has been recorded from California and Nevada. Moths in this genus are distinguished from moths in similar genera by their small palpi and obsolete tongues.

References

Odontiini
Crambidae genera
Taxa named by Eugene G. Munroe
Monotypic moth genera